Probable cation-transporting ATPase 13A3 is an enzyme that in humans is encoded by the ATP13A3 gene.

References

External links

Further reading